Evie Dominikovic and Alicia Molik were the defending champions, but they did not compete in the Junior's this year.

The unseeded pair of Eleni Daniilidou and Virginie Razzano won in the final 6–1, 6–1, against South Africans Natalie Grandin and Nicole Rencken.

Seeds

Draw

Finals

Top half

Bottom half

External links
 Main Draw

Girls' Doubles
Australian Open, 1999 Girls' Doubles